Hells Gate Island is a small island located in Antigua. It is known for its unique natural formation of a narrow channel, called Hell's Gate, that runs between the island and the mainland. Hells Gate Island is a popular tourist destination.

See also 
Devil's Bridge, Antigua and Barbuda

References

Islands of Antigua and Barbuda